Tarini Prasad Koirala (30 April 1922–1974) was a Nepalese politician, journalist, writer belonging to the Nepali Congress Party and the Koirala family.

Koirala was born into a politically powerful family, the son of Krishna Prasad Koirala and brother of Prime Ministers of Nepal Bishweshwar Prasad Koirala, Matrika Prasad Koirala and Girija Prasad Koirala.

Koirala was active in politics and was a pioneer of the Nepalese labor movement along with his brothers in Srinagar. Later his brother B. P. Koirala and the Nepali Congress party were swept into power in the country's first democratic election. He was in the forefront of the leaders who took part in 1947 Srinagar jute mill strike along with Girija Prasad Koirala, Yuvaraj Adhikari Man Mohan Adhikari.

He was among the six National Congress leaders i.e. Bishweshwar Prasad Koirala, Girija Prasad Koirala, Yuvaraj Adhikar, Gehendrahari Sharma, Manmohan Adhikari who were taken to Kathmandu as the prisoners of conscience from Biratnagar via the land routes. It took 24 days for them to reach Kathmandu on foot, and was jailed at a Sundarijal-based prison after completing the walk. He was in an active role in and after abolition of Rana rule.

See also
Yuvaraj Adhikari
Biratnagar jute mill strike

References

Date of death missing
T
1922 births
People from Biratnagar
1974 deaths
Nepali Congress politicians from Koshi Province